Pablo Martín Bangardino (born 9 January 1985), is a football goalkeeper. He currently plays for Villa San Carlos.

Career
Bangardino started his career with Gimnasia y Esgrima de La Plata. He played loaned during 2007 in Uruguayan Central Español, and played his first 9 games with Gimnasia La Plata when he returned from the loan. In 2010, he was loaned again, this time to second division Gimnasia y Esgrima de Jujuy.

References

External links
Pablo Bangardino – Argentine Primera statistics at Fútbol XXI 
Profile at Football-Lineups

1985 births
Living people
Footballers from La Plata
Argentine footballers
Association football goalkeepers
Argentine Primera División players
Club de Gimnasia y Esgrima La Plata footballers
Central Español players
Gimnasia y Esgrima de Jujuy footballers
Club Atlético Sarmiento footballers
Expatriate footballers in Uruguay